Sister Maria Rosalina Madroñal Abejo, RVM (July 13, 1922 – June 5, 1991) was a Filipino composer, pianist and conductor. She was born in Tagoloan in Misamis Oriental in the Philippines, and died in Fremont, California. She is the first Filipina composer and conductor, and a nun of the Congregation of the Religious of the Virgin Mary. Her aunt, the late Sister Maria Rosario Madroñal, RVM was her first music teacher.

She studied composition at the Philippine Women's University, and in 1977, she moved to the United States, where she studied at Eastman School of Music and The Catholic University of America. She was the first nun to direct and conduct symphony orchestras, by permission of Pope John XXIII. She taught composition and music theory at the University of Kansas and St Pius Seminary in Kentucky. Before this, she travelled extensively in order to fundraise for and attend international music conferences. In 1972, Abejo wrote Overture 1081, when martial law was declared by Ferdinand Marcos in the Philippines through Proclamation No. 1081. Abejo has received a number of honours, including the Republic Culture Heritage Award (1967), Philippines' Independence Day Award (1973), and being elected President of the Philippine Foundation of Performing Arts in America in 1980. She is interred at Irvington Memorial Cemetery, Fremont, California.

Compositions
In her lifetime, Rosalina Abejo composed over 400 works.

Orchestra 

Beatriz Symphony
Gregoria Symphony (1950)
Pioneer Symphony (1954)
Thanatopsis Symphony (1956)
Aeloian Piano Concerto (1956)
Golden Foundation Piano Concerto (1959-1960)
Guerilla Symphony (1971)
The Trilogy of Man Symphony (1971)
Dalawang Pusong Dakila Symphony (1975)
 Brotherhood Symphony, 1986,
 Jubilee Symphony, 1984,
 Symphony of Psalms, 1988,
 Symphony of Life, 1988,
 Symphony of Fortitude and Sudden Spring, 1989.
 Overture 1081
 3 String Quartets

References

1922 births
1991 deaths
20th-century composers
20th-century women composers
Catholic University of America alumni
Eastman School of Music alumni
Filipino classical composers
Filipino conductors (music)
Filipino emigrants to the United States
20th-century Filipino Roman Catholic nuns
Filipino women composers
Musicians from Misamis Oriental
Philippine Women's University alumni
University of Kansas faculty
20th-century American Roman Catholic nuns